Hatu Peak is located in the Shimla district of Himachal Pradesh in India. It is one of the highest peaks in the region, standing at an elevation of 3400 m (11,152 ft) above sea level. The peak is surrounded by dense forest of conifers, oaks and maples.

Location 

Hatu Peak lies beside National Highway 5 nearly 71 km from Shimla. From Narkanda, the peak can be accessed by bike or car.

Attractions

Hatu Temple 

At the top of the peak is a small wooden temple called Hatu temple. 
According to local belief, the famous Hatu Mata temple is the temple of Maa Kaali. On the first Sunday of Jyeshtha, groups of people arrive in large numbers to engage in rituals. Near the temple, there is an ancient stove-like formation of rocks that locals believe to be used by the Pandavas brothers to cook their food during their Agyaat Vaas.

Tourist House 
A small structure has been created which is used on rare occasions by civil authorities.

Scenic Views 
The steep road to Hatu Peak provides scenic views of the Himalayas.

Flora 
The peak and the surrounding area is dominated by a large temperate forest mostly consist of  Conifer, Oak, Maple, Populus, Aesculus, Corylus and Holly species.

Conifer: There are various species of conifers growing in the area which cover the substantial part of the forest. These are:

1.Abies pindrow,

2.Cedrus deodara,

3. Cryptomeria japonica,

4. Picea smithiana,

5.Pinus wallichiana,

6. Taxus contorta.

Oak:  Quercus semecarpifolia and Quercus floribunda are native to the area.

Maple: Acer caesium, Acer acuminatum and Acer cappadocicum are native to the area.

Poplar: Populus ciliata is native to the area.

Aesculus: Aesculus indica is native to the area.

Hazelnut: Corylus jacquemontii is native to the area.

Holly: Ilex dipyrena is native to the area.

Apart from these major trees, there are various species shrubs like Berberis aristata and flower plants growing in the area. Recently, the forest has been cleared for the apple orchards.

Accessibility 
The small hill station of Narkanda (at 2708 m) is the start for the journey to the top of Hatu Peak.

Air 

Shimla has a small airstrip located on a nearby hill top (in Jubbarhatti, about 23 km south of town). This airstrip is too small to support jets, so the only service available is from Jagson Airlines which offers single flight service into Shimla from Delhi on Monday, Wednesday and Friday.

Train 

A narrow gauge "toy" train service runs from Kalka to Shimla.  This service takes about 4 hours to wind up the ridges to the hill station.

Bus 

There are numerous bus services to Shimla from Delhi, Manali and Chandigarh on a daily basis.

Facilities 
Hatu Peak is uninhabited and therefore few facilities are available at the top. There is a tourist lodge by HPTC 1 km below the peak which can be used for general facilities and accommodation.

References 

Mountains of Himachal Pradesh
Geography of Shimla district